Plumb House may refer to:

Plumb House (Clearwater, Florida) 
Plumb House (Middletown, Connecticut) 
Plumb House (Waynesboro, Virginia)